Aneurin Barnard (born 8 May 1987) is a Welsh actor. He is known for playing Davey in Hunky Dory, Claude in The Truth About Emanuel, Bobby Willis in Cilla, Tim in Thirteen, King Richard III in The White Queen, William in Dead in a Week (Or Your Money Back), Gibson in Dunkirk, and Boris Pavlikovsky in The Goldfinch.

Early life
Barnard was born in Bridgend in Wales in the United Kingdom on 8 May 1987, the son of factory worker June and coal miner Terry Barnard. His first language is Welsh. He attended Ysgol Gyfun Llanhari in Rhondda Cynon Taf during his secondary school years. Barnard trained at the Royal Welsh College of Music & Drama, graduating in 2008, and was credited as a RWCMD Associate Award in 2019.

Career

Theatre
Barnard was just 11 years of age when he began involvement in theatre work at the Bridgend County Youth Theatre in 1999. Whilst a student at drama school, he appeared in productions of The Caucasian Chalk Circle, Hobson’s Choice, The Importance of Being Earnest and West Side Story, in which he played Tony. He was also involved in a radio production of Under Milk Wood.

He played Melchior, one of the three leads, in the London premiere of the Tony Award-winning musical Spring Awakening, which opened in February 2009 at the Lyric Hammersmith. The play later transferred to the Novello Theatre in March 2009, running until May 2009. Barnard won a Laurence Olivier Award for his role in Spring Awakening in 2010.

Screen
Barnard starred in HTV Wales series Jacob's Ladder as a 16-year-old. He has appeared in guest roles in TV series Doctors, Casualty, Shameless, and Y Pris. He has also appeared in the short TV films The Big Day, Night on the Tiles and the BAFTA Cymru-winning Owl Creek Bridge.

In 2011 Barnard starred in Hunky Dory, co-starring with  Minnie Driver. Barnard played the role of Davey and in the film sang songs from the era such as David Bowie's "Life on Mars" and The Who's "Love Reign O'er Me".

In January 2012 Barnard starred as photographer David Bailey in the television film We'll Take Manhattan. He also appeared in the 2012 horror movie Elfie Hopkins. Barnard then appeared in the lead role in Vertigo Films's Guinea Pigs, a micro-budget horror film about volunteers fighting for their lives after a drug trial goes wrong. Later in 2012 he starred in the horror-thriller film Citadel.

In 2012, Barnard filmed the fantasy adventure movie The Adventurer: The Curse of the Midas Box throughout the South West of England, playing the title role of Mariah Mundi alongside Michael Sheen. The movie was released in 2014. Barnard also featured in Trap for Cinderella (2013), and as Claude in Francesca Gregorini's drama thriller, The Truth About Emanuel. In 2013, Barnard portrayed King Richard III of England in the television series The White Queen on BBC One. He also appeared as John Trenchard in a two-part Sky TV adaptation of Moonfleet.

In 2017, he also appeared in the film Bitter Harvest. He played the music manager Bobby Willis in ITV's 3-part drama Cilla.

In 2016, he starred as Prince Boris Drubetskoy in Andrew Davies's television adaptation of Leo Tolstoy's War and Peace, broadcast on BBC One, for which he was nominated for Best Actor (Yr Actor Gorau). He starred as Tim Hobson, boyfriend of Ivy Moxham, (played by Jodie Comer) in the BBC 5 part drama Thirteen.

In 2017, Barnard had the lead role as Wolfgang Amadeus Mozart in Interlude in Prague. The following year, he played William in British comedy, Dead In A Week (or your money back). In 2022, it was announced that Barnard would appear in the fourteenth series of Doctor Who as Roger ap Gwilliam.

In 2021, Barnard starred in the BBC One prison drama Time alongside Sean Bean and Stephen Graham earning a second nomination for Best Actor (Yr Actor Gorau).

Barnard starred as Ryan in the Channel 5 series The Catch in January 2023, alongside Jason Watkins and Poppy Gilbert.

Filmography

Film

Television

Awards and nominations

References

External links

 
 
 
 

Alumni of the Royal Welsh College of Music & Drama
Living people
Laurence Olivier Award winners
People from Bridgend
Welsh male film actors
Welsh male stage actors
Welsh male television actors
1987 births
21st-century Welsh male actors